Waseem Ahmed may refer to:
Waseem Ahmed (cricketer) (born 1993), Indian cricketer
Waseem Ahmed (artist) (born 1976), Pakistani artist
Waseem Ahmed (field hockey) (born 1977), Pakistani field hockey player